The Debt, officially called as La deuda (o la insólita muerte y no menos asombrosa resurrección y segunda muerte de Alí Ibrahim María de los Altos Pozos y Resuello, llamado El Turco), is a 1997 Colombian drama film directed by Manuel José Álvarez and Nicolás Buenaventura. The film was selected as the Colombian entry for the Best Foreign Language Film at the 70th Academy Awards, but was not accepted as a nominee.

Cast
 Nicolás Buenaventura
 Manuel José Álvarez
 Vicky Hernández
 Jairo Camargo
 Humberto Dorado
 Marcela Valencia

See also
 List of submissions to the 70th Academy Awards for Best Foreign Language Film
 List of Colombian submissions for the Academy Award for Best Foreign Language Film

References

External links
 

1997 films
1997 drama films
1990s Spanish-language films
Colombian drama films